Catherine wheel may refer to:

  wheel or breaking wheel, an instrument of torturous execution originally associated with Saint Catherine of Alexandria
 Catherine wheel (firework), a firework that rotates when lit

Arts and entertainment
 Catherine Wheel (band), 1990s British alternative rock band
 The Catherine Wheel, (dance) a 1981 dance by Twyla Tharp, with music by David Byrne
 The Catherine Wheel (album), a 1981 recording of David Byrne's musical score commissioned by Twyla Tharp for the dance
 The Catherine Wheel, a 1983 BBC film of the Twyla Tharp dance
 "Catherine Wheels", a song by Crowded House from the 1993 album Together Alone
 "Catherine Wheel", a song by Megan Washington from the 2020 album Batflowers
"Katherine Wheel", a song by HIM from the 2010 album Screamworks: Love in Theory and Practice
 The Catherine Wheel, a 1949 crime novel by Patricia Wentworth
The Catherine Wheel, a 1952 novel by Jean Stafford

Other uses
 Catherine wheel, an older term for the cartwheel in gymnastics
 Catherine wheel (window), a type of spoked circular window
 Catherine-wheel pincushion (Leucospermum catherinae), a flowering evergreen

See also
 Pinwheel (disambiguation)